Callindra lenzeni is a moth of the family Erebidae. It was described by Franz Daniel in 1943. It is found in Yunnan, China.

References

Callimorphina
Moths described in 1943